Fort De Lesseps was a small U.S. Army Coast Artillery Corps fort located at the northern tip of Colón, Panama. It was named  after Ferdinand de Lesseps. It consisted of only one battery of two six-inch guns called battery Morgan, which were located across from the Hotel Washington. It had a spur from the railyards to its dock, where there was an administration building and barracks. Around the corner from the dock were five officers' houses and a theater. Between the gun batteries and hotel there was a sea-level swimming pool. The fort was occupied from 1913 until 1955.

References

Closed installations of the United States Army
Military installations of the United States in Panama
Colón, Panama
Buildings and structures in Colón Province
Military installations established in 1913
1913 establishments in Panama
Military installations closed in 1955
1955 disestablishments in Panama